Pegge is a surname, and may refer to:

Catherine Pegge, mistress of King Charles II of England and mother of Charles FitzCharles, 1st Earl of Plymouth
Edward Pegge, Wales international rugby union player 
Edward Pegge (High Sheriff) of Beauchief High Sheriff of Derbyshire 1664
Maud Pegge, the British archaeologist Maud Cunnington
Peter Pegge-Burnell of Beauchief  High Sheriff of Derbyshire 1788
Samuel Pegge, British antiquary 
Samuel Pegge (the younger), British antiquary
Strelley Pegge of Beauchief High Sheriff of Derbyshire 1739